Marco Leonel Domínguez Ramírez (born 25 February 1996) is a professional footballer who plays as a midfielder for Liga Nacional club Mixco. Born in Canada, he  represents the Guatemala national team.

Club career

FC Montreal
Domínguez began his youth career with Braves d'Ahuntsic where he played for six years before joining the Montreal Impact Academy in 2013. On 13 March 2015, he joined FC Montreal, a USL affiliate club of the Montreal Impact, for their inaugural season. He made his professional debut on 14 May in the club's first win their history, defeating the Charleston Battery 1–0. At the conclusion of the 2016 USL season, FC Montreal would cease operations after 2 seasons.

FC Cincinnati
In January 2017, FC Cincinnati announced that they had signed Domínguez for the 2017 USL season. At the end of the season, FC Cincinnati announced that they would not exercise their option to keep him.

Antigua GFC
On 4 May 2018 Domínguez signed with Guatemalan National League side Antigua GFC.

International career
Through birth and descent (from a Dominican mother and a Guatemalan father), Domínguez is eligible to play for Canada, the Dominican Republic and Guatemala. He made his senior debut for the latter on 4 March 2020 in a 0–2 friendly loss to Panama. He had been a member of the Canadian under-17 side that competed at the 2013 CONCACAF U-17 Championship as well as the 2013 FIFA U-17 World Cup.

Honours
Antigua
Liga Nacional de Guatemala: Clausura 2019

References

External links
 
 
 

1996 births
Living people
People with acquired Guatemalan citizenship
Guatemalan footballers
Association football midfielders
FC Cincinnati (2016–18) players
Antigua GFC players
USL Championship players
Liga Nacional de Fútbol de Guatemala players
Guatemalan people of Dominican Republic descent
Sportspeople of Dominican Republic descent
Guatemalan expatriate footballers
Guatemalan expatriate sportspeople in the United States
Expatriate soccer players in the United States
Soccer players from Montreal
Canadian soccer players
FC Montreal players
Canada men's youth international soccer players
Black Canadian soccer players
Canadian people of Dominican Republic descent
Canadian people of Guatemalan descent
Canadian sportspeople of North American descent
Sportspeople of Guatemalan descent
Canadian expatriate soccer players
Canadian expatriate sportspeople in the United States
2021 CONCACAF Gold Cup players
Canadian expatriate sportspeople in Kuwait
Guatemalan expatriate sportspeople in Kuwait
Al-Yarmouk SC (Kuwait) players
Kuwait Premier League players